Cederschiöld is a Swedish surname that may refer to:

Carl Cederschiöld, Swedish politician
Charlotte Cederschiöld (born 1944), Swedish politician 
Gunnar Cederschiöld (1887–1949), Swedish fencer
Hugo Cederschiöld (1878–1968), Swedish officer and sports shooter
Margareta Cederschiöld (1879–1962), Swedish tennis player, sister of Hugo
Maria Cederschiöld (1856–1935), Swedish journalist and women's rights activist
Maria Cederschiöld (deaconess) (1815–1892), Swedish deaconess and nurse

Swedish-language surnames